Ghumaite Dao Shranto Rabire (Eng :Let the tired sun(Rabindranath Tagore) sleep) is a memorial song composed by Kazi Nazrul Islam. On 22nd Shravan of Bengali 1348 (7 August 1941 AD), poet Nazrul composed the poem 'Ravihara' and the said music on the death anniversary of poet Rabindranath Tagore. He then recorded his vocals at His Master's Voice Studios (HMV) with fellow artists Ela Mitra and Sunil Ghosh, which was broadcast live across India from the 'Akashvani' at Garstin Place.

Refferance 

Bengali-language songs
1941 songs
Songs written by Kazi Nazrul Islam